Cory Stillman (born December 20, 1973) is a Canadian professional ice hockey executive and former player. He played in the National Hockey League (NHL) for several teams between 1994 and 2011, winning the Stanley Cup twice. He is currently an assistant coach with the Arizona Coyotes.

Drafted sixth overall by the Calgary Flames in 1992, Stillman was an AHL All Star with the Flames' affiliate in Saint John in 1995. As well as the Flames, he would go on to play for the St. Louis Blues, Tampa Bay Lightning, Carolina Hurricanes, Ottawa Senators, and Florida Panthers over his 15-year NHL career, scoring over 700 points over more than 1,000 games.

Stillman won the Stanley Cup in 2004 and 2006 with the Lightning and Hurricanes, respectively. He is one of only 12 players in the NHL's history to win the Stanley Cup in back-to-back seasons with different teams (the 2004–2005 season was wiped out by a lockout).

Playing career 
Stillman grew up in Peterborough, Ontario playing hockey for the Minor Petes (OMHA) program.  He also played competitive baseball.  In 1989–90, Strellman played for the Peterborough Roadrunners Jr.B. (MTJHL) hockey club before being a 2nd round choice (27th overall) of the Windsor Spitfires in the 1990 Ontario Hockey League Priority Selection.

Calgary Flames 

Stillman started his professional career in 1992, when he was drafted sixth overall in the first round by the Calgary Flames. Stillman was tried on both wings, and was quoted saying he liked the left side better but he can play right wing easily if needed. He would play one more season in the OHL with Peterborough, scoring 25 goals and 55 assists in 61 games in 1992–93, upon which he joined the Flames organization with the Saint John Flames of the American Hockey League. Stillman  excelled at this level, posting an 83-point campaign (35 goals, 48 assists) across 79 games in 1993–94. With the NHL in a lockout at the beginning of the 1994–95 season, Stillman  remained in the AHL to begin the following season, and in his second season at this level, his performance level improved more, with 28 goals and 53 assists across 63 games.

Upon the end of the lockout, the 1994–95 NHL season began in earnest in January; the Flames played their first game on January 20 and, in time for their ninth game of the season on February 6, Stillman  made his NHL debut. This game would turn out be a 5–4 home defeat against the Winnipeg Jets, and Stillman  recorded his first NHL point on a 3rd-period assist on what was, at the time, the go-ahead goal before the Flames faltered late. He would notch another assist in his second career game, but failed to find the scoresheet in his next eight games, at which point he was reassigned to Saint John. Back at this level, the AHL Flames qualified for the postseason despite a lackluster 27–40–13 record, the #4 seed from the AHL's Atlantic Division, and were quickly dispatched in the first round by the #1 seeded Prince Edward Island Senators. Saint John's 1–0 defeat in Game 5 on April 21 would represent Stillman's final career game at the AHL level.

Stillman  became a regular in the Flames lineup beginning in 1995–96, though it would take a couple seasons for him to begin meeting expectations offensively that he had established in his minor league performances. After scoring only 22 goals and 61 points across his first two seasons, Stillman reached a new level during the 1997–98 season in Calgary, scoring 27 goals. He would match that feat again the following season, and those 27 goals would come to represent his single-season career high. Alas for Stillman, his rounding into form coincided with a downturn in fortune for the Flames. Calgary, who had qualified for the playoffs every season except one between 1976 through until 1996, would not qualify for the playoffs for the rest of his time in the organization. He only played two playoff games for the Flames in 1996, when a declining Flames team qualified as the #7 seed and were swept in the first round by the Blackhawks.

St. Louis Blues 

Hampered by injury, Stillman only played 37 games in 1999-2000 and recorded 21 points. He bounced back during 2000–01 with 21 goals across 66 games before he was traded to the St. Louis Blues in an effort to bolster the Blues' roster ahead of the postseason. The Blues finished the regular season with 103 points and were the #4 seed in the Western Conference, and made it to the Western Conference Finals, avenging an upset in the first round against the San Jose Sharks in the previous season as well as sweeping the Pacific Division champion Dallas Stars in the second round before losing four games to one to the eventual Cup winners in the Colorado Avalanche. For his part, Stillman chipped in three goals and five assists across 15 games, including an assist on the tying goal and then scoring the game-winning goal in overtime of Game 3 against Dallas.

Stillman would score 23 goals the following season and another 24 in the 2002–03 season, as the Blues would make the playoffs in both seasons but failed to make deep runs as they were defeated in the second round in 2002 by the Detroit Red Wings, who also went on to win the Cup that season, and then lost in the first round in the 2003 postseason to the Vancouver Canucks in seven games, surrendering a 3–1 lead in the series along the way. Stillman only recorded two goals across 15 playoff games across those two postseasons, totaling five goals and nine assists in 30 playoff games he played with the Blues overall, an average of roughly half a point per game and below the standards he had established from his regular season performances. A pending free agent at the end of the 2003–04 season, he was traded during the off-season to the Tampa Bay Lightning for a draft pick that eventually turned out to be long-time Blues stalwart, and later captain, David Backes.

Tampa Bay Lightning 

The Tampa Bay Lightning, who had been an also-ran for most of their franchise history dating back to 1992, had an unexpectedly successful season in 2002–03, going 36–25–16–5 for a 93-point season and winning their first division championship along the way. They were defeated in the second round by the New Jersey Devils and with one of their top forwards, Vaclav Prospal, slated to hit free agency, the Lightning acquired Stillman from St. Louis for a second round pick. During the regular season, Stillman lived up to expectations and then some, as he would score 25 goals and record 80 points, a career-high, across 81 games, giving the Lightning some much needed scoring depth alongside standout forwards Martin St. Louis, Vincent Lecavalier, and Brad Richards. After their division championship of the previous season, the Lightning would exceed these levels in 2003–04, repeating as Southeast Division champions and finishing as the #1 seed in the Eastern Conference with 106 points. The Lightning would win 25 of their final 36 regular season games, with Stillman scoring 11 goals and 46 points coinciding with this spurt.

For Stillman, he and his team would take divergent paths during the postseason. After a superb regular season, he was quiet during the postseason, scoring only two goals and five assists across 21 playoff games and only finding the scoresheet once in his last eight games. Ultimately, the Lightning were able to overcome Stillman's power outage as they would win the Stanley Cup in seven games against the team that originally drafted him, the Calgary Flames, overcoming a 3–2 deficit by winning the final two games of the series.

During the 2004 NHL Entry Draft, the Lightning re-acquired Prospal and did not re-sign Stillman, who hit free agency on July 1, 2004. With the 2004-05 NHL lockout, it would be 16 months before Stillman, or any NHL player, would play another game in the NHL.

Carolina Hurricanes 

During the free-agent signing period following the end of the 2004–05 NHL lockout, Stillman agreed to a three-year contract with the Carolina Hurricanes August 2, 2005. There, his team also won the Stanley Cup. He became the first player since Claude Lemieux to win consecutive Cups with different teams, being the eleventh overall and most recent to do so until Patrick Maroon accomplished the feat in 2020.

Stillman waived his no-trade clause February 11, 2008, so that the Hurricanes could trade him along with Mike Commodore to the Ottawa Senators for Patrick Eaves and Joe Corvo.

On July 1, 2008, Stillman signed a 3-year deal worth $10.6 million with the Florida Panthers.

On February 17, 2011, Stillman played his 1,000th NHL game against the Philadelphia Flyers at BankAtlantic Center in Sunrise, Florida.

The Florida Panthers traded Stillman back to the Carolina Hurricanes on February 24, 2011, in exchange for Ryan Carter and a fifth-round pick in the 2011 NHL Entry Draft.

Executive and coaching career
Stillman announced his retirement after 16 seasons in the NHL on September 8, 2011. He initially joined the Florida Panthers staff as a development coach in the preceding 2011-12 season before returning to the Hurricanes the following year as the Director of Player Development and Director of Forwards Development.

Stillman remained in his role with the Hurricanes from 2012 until May 25, 2017, when the Sudbury Wolves of the Ontario Hockey League announced the hiring of Stillman as their new head coach. He led the Wolves for three seasons with a 94–89–16 record. In 2020, he was hired by the Arizona Coyotes as an assistant coach.

Personal life
Stillman is married to the former Mara Stefanski. The Stillmans have three children, Riley, Madison and Chase, who currently plays for the Peterborough Petes after being traded from the Sudbury Wolves, his father's former team. His father-in-law is former AHL player Bud Stefanski.  Stefanski was general manager and coach of the Mississauga St. Michael's Majors of the OHL from 2003 to 2007. His son, Riley, was drafted from the OHL Oshawa Generals to the Florida Panthers in the 2016 NHL Draft as the 114th overall pick, and currently plays for the Buffalo Sabres.

Career statistics

Regular season and playoffs

International

Coaching record

Ontario Hockey League

Awards and honours

References

External links

1973 births
Living people
Calgary Flames draft picks
Calgary Flames players
Canadian ice hockey left wingers
Carolina Hurricanes coaches
Carolina Hurricanes players
Florida Panthers coaches
Florida Panthers players
Ice hockey people from Ontario
National Hockey League first-round draft picks
Ottawa Senators players
Peterborough Petes (ice hockey) players
Saint John Flames players
St. Louis Blues players
Sportspeople from Peterborough, Ontario
Stanley Cup champions
Tampa Bay Lightning players
Windsor Spitfires players
Canadian ice hockey coaches
Canadian expatriate ice hockey players in the United States